Thomas A. "Captain Tom" Mathis (June 7, 1869 – May 18, 1958) was an American politician and the Republican boss and racketeer of Ocean County, New Jersey during the early 20th century. He served in the New Jersey Senate and was the Secretary of State of New Jersey from 1931 to 1941. His son was state senator W. Steelman Mathis.

A very corrupt figure in New Jersey politics, Mathis reportedly received kickbacks on illegal gambling and prostitution operations. He committed suicide on May 18, 1958, at his home in Toms River, New Jersey at age 88.

References

1869 births
1958 deaths
Republican Party New Jersey state senators
Majority leaders of the New Jersey Senate
Presidents of the New Jersey Senate
Secretaries of State of New Jersey
People from Burlington County, New Jersey
People from Toms River, New Jersey
American political bosses from New Jersey